The 2022 Washington Huskies football team represented the University of Washington as a member of the Pac–12 Conference during the 2022 NCAA Division I FBS football season. Led by first-year head coach Kalen DeBoer, the Huskies played their home games at Husky Stadium in Seattle.

Roster

Schedule

Rankings

Game summaries

vs Kent State

vs Portland State

vs #11 Michigan State

vs Stanford

at UCLA

at Arizona State

vs Arizona

at California

vs #23 Oregon State

at #6 Oregon

vs Colorado

at Washington State

References

Washington
Washington Huskies football seasons
Alamo Bowl champion seasons
2022 in sports in Washington (state)